Torre de Juan Abad is a municipality in the province of Ciudad Real, Castile-La Mancha, Spain. It has a population of 1,139.

References

Municipalities in the Province of Ciudad Real